The Hong Kong Film Award for Best Asian Film is a retired Hong Kong Film Award that was presented from 2003-2011. The award has since been replaced by the award for Best Film from Mainland and Taiwan.

References

External links
 Hong Kong Film Awards Official Site

Hong Kong Film Awards
Awards for best Asian film